Valaitis is a Lithuanian surname. Notable people with the surname include:

Aurimas Valaitis (born 1988), Lithuanian swimmer
Gene Valaitis, Canadian radio personality
Lena Valaitis (born 1943), Lithuanian-German singer

Lithuanian-language surnames